Biseokchigi is a traditional Korean game that consist on kicking or throwing an opponent's stone to be taken down at a certain distance. It is a game that is widely practiced among children and is called as different names depending on the regions. Some of those names are biseokchagi (비석차기), biseokkagi (비석까기), mogjakkagi (목자까기), jakkagi (자까기), bisasaeggi (비사색기), etc. Etymologically it means tombstone.

This game can be played by just two people, but it is more fun to have several people split into 2 teams. After determining the order, one team place its stones side by side at regular intervals. Then, the other team throws its stones and knocks down the opponent's stones at a certain distance. At this time, if this team turns over all the opponent's stones, they win. If they do not, the turn to play is passed to the other team.

Origin
Biseokchigi is a game with a long history, but it is difficult to find a record of its origin −thus the various names by which it is known in different areas− giving that it is only required to play a few flat stones and an open space or yard. However, according to the origins of the oral tradition, the background of this game reflects the late Joseon era. There are many places called Monument Streets all over the country, and this is a place name given to the monuments standing side by side.

How to play
Since this game is played nationwide, the method of play differs slightly from region to region.
  Draw two long lines at a distance of 4 ~ 5m.
  Each person prepares a palm-sized stone then each captain or player, if they are not playing in teams, uses a rock-paper-scissors to decide who will attack first.
  The losing team must place the stone vertically on the previously drawn line while the winners throw their stones trying to knock down the rival's. There are several stages of biseokchigi, as you can simply throw the rock while standing or carry it with your shoulder, head, feet or even your armpit and drop it off.
  If the opponent's stone cannot be knocked down or is missed while moving, the attacker will change
  The person or team who has passed the whole process and its stone remain standing wins.

References 

 Encyclopedia of Korean Folk Culture

Throwing games
Korean culture